Filotti is a Romanian surname. Notable people with the surname include:

 Eugen Filotti (1896–1975), Romanian diplomat, journalist and writer
 Ion Filotti Cantacuzino (born 1908), Romanian film producer, film producer, writer and psychiatrist
 Maria Filotti (born 1883), Romanian actress
 Maria Filotti Theatre, theatre in Brăila, Romania

Romanian-language surnames